Angustia del pasado, is a Mexican telenovela produced by Televisa and originally transmitted by Telesistema Mexicano.

Cast 
María Elena Marqués
Augusto Benedico
Raúl Ramírez
Bárbara Gil
Queta Lavat

References

External links 

Mexican telenovelas
Televisa telenovelas
Spanish-language telenovelas
1967 telenovelas
1967 Mexican television series debuts
1967 Mexican television series endings